The  Mark 60 CAPTOR (Encapsulated Torpedo) is the United States' only deep-water anti-submarine naval mine. It uses a Mark 46 torpedo contained in an aluminum shell that is anchored to the ocean floor. The mine can be placed by either aircraft, submarine or surface vessel. The torpedo, once placed, can last anywhere from weeks to months underwater. The original production contract of the CAPTOR mine was awarded to Goodyear Aerospace in 1972, and entered service in 1979. It was hoped to reduce minefield costs and used in the creation of a barrier of the "Greenland-Iceland-United Kingdom gap to interrupt Soviet submarines in the event that deterrence failed."

The mine uses Reliable Acoustic Path (RAP) sound propagation to passively identify and track the difference between hostile submarine signatures, surface vessels and friendly submarines. Once identified, the torpedo leaves its casing to destroy its target.

References

External links

 https://www.youtube.com/watch?v=OJVQeHwrjsQ

Aerial torpedoes
Naval mines
Torpedoes of the United States
Cold War weapons of the United States
Military equipment introduced in the 1970s